Patton Historic District is a national historic district located at Patton in Cambria County, Pennsylvania. The district includes 42 contributing buildings in a predominantly residential area of Patton. The predominant architectural style is American Foursquare, with some notable examples of Colonial Revival and Romanesque Revival styles. Notable buildings include the St. Mary's Church (1899), St. Mary's Rectory (1899), St. Mary's School (1913), A. O. Summerville House (c. 1897), W. H. Sanford House (c. 1897), Charles Rhody House (c. 1890), Dr. Stiles House (1907), Prindible Houses (c. 1893-1897), Trinity United Methodist Church (1901), St. Peter and Paul Orthodox Church (1904), Cambria Heights Middle School (1894), and Patton High School (1903).

It was listed on the National Register of Historic Places in 1996.

References 

Colonial Revival architecture in Pennsylvania
Romanesque Revival architecture in Pennsylvania
Historic districts in Cambria County, Pennsylvania
Historic districts on the National Register of Historic Places in Pennsylvania
National Register of Historic Places in Cambria County, Pennsylvania